Agency Lake is a natural lake located west of Chiloquin in Klamath County, Oregon. It is actually the northern arm of Upper Klamath Lake, connected by a narrow channel.
Its primary inflow is the Wood River, while its outflow is Upper Klamath Lake (indirectly the Link River, Upper Klamath Lake's outflow).
The lake is very shallow, and experiences high winds.
[Modoc Point Road] runs along the east side. Agency Lake Resort is located on the east side of the lake.

Wetland restoration
The Bureau of Land Management (BLM) has been working to restore  of wetland near the mouth of the Wood River since 1997. The wetlands were damaged in the 1960s and 70s when water was diverted for farmland. The BLM also plans to add walking trails and picnic areas.

Flora and fauna
The most common type of fish in the lake are trout, especially Great Basin redband trout. Over 50 species of birds live on or near the lake.

Recreation
Fishing is a popular activity on the lake. Six boat ramps are located on the lake. The Agency Lake Resort, located on the lake's eastern shore, features a campground with 40 campsites, marina, boat ramp, and convenience store.

Agency Lake can be accessed by boat or canoe from the marshes route off Malone Springs.

See also
 List of lakes in Oregon

References

External links

Lakes of Oregon
Lakes of Klamath County, Oregon
Bureau of Land Management areas in Oregon
Fremont–Winema National Forest
Protected areas of Klamath County, Oregon